Trainor is a surname of British origin, prevalent in English-speaking countries. It may refer to the following notable people:

Bernard E. Trainor (1928–2018), American journalist and marine officer
Bobby Trainor (1934 –  2020), Northern Irish association footballer
Charles St. Clair Trainor (1901–1978), Canadian lawyer, judge, and politician
Conor Trainor (born 1989), Canadian rugby union player
Danny Trainor (1944–1974), Northern Irish association footballer
David Owen Trainor, American television director
James E. Trainor III, American lawyer and government official
Jerry Trainor (born 1977), American actor, comedian, and musician
Jordan Trainor (born 1996), New Zealand rugby union player
Kendall Trainor (born 1967), American former gridiron football player
Kevin Trainor, Irish actor
Kim Trainor, Canadian poet
Larry Trainor (1905–1975), American political activist
Luke Trainor (1900–1973), Australian rules footballer
Martyn Trainor (born 1944), South African former naval officer
Mary Ellen Trainor (1952–2015), American actress
Meghan Trainor (born 1993), American singer
Mike Trainor (born 1981), American stand-up comedian and writer
Nicholas Trainor (born 1975), English former cricketer
Owen Trainor (1894–1956), Canadian politician and Member of Parliament
Patrick F. Trainor (1863–1902), American politician
Peter Trainor (1915–1973), English association footballer
Rick Trainor (born 1948), American-British academic administrator and historian
Wes Trainor (1921–1991), Canadian ice hockey player

See also
Trainer
Gabrielle Trainor Medal

References